Francesco Satolli (21 July 1839 – 8 January 1910) was an Italian theologian, professor, cardinal, and the first Apostolic Delegate to the United States.

Biography 

He was born on 21 July 1839, at Marsciano near Perugia. He was educated at the seminary of Perugia, ordained in 1862, and after receiving the doctorate at the Roman Sapienza university, was appointed in 1864 professor in the seminary of Perugia. In 1870 he became pastor at Marsciano and in 1872 went to Montecassino, where he remained two years.

Called to Rome by Leo XIII in 1880, Satolli was appointed professor of dogmatic theology in the Propaganda Fide. In 1882 he was appointed professor at the Roman Seminary. On 7 March 1882 at the Dominican church of Santa Maria sopra Minerva Satolli delivered the annual encomium in honor of St. Thomas Aquinas to the Dominican College of St. Thomas, the future Pontifical University of Saint Thomas Aquinas Satolli was rector of the Greek College (1884). He was appointed president of the Accademia dei Nobili Ecclesiastici in 1886. In 1888 he was appointed Titular Archbishop of Naupactus. As professor he had an important share in the neo-Scholastic movement inaugurated by pope Leo XIII. His lectures, always fluent and often eloquent, aroused the enthusiasm of his students for the study of St. Thomas Aquinas, while his writings opened the way for an extended literature in Thomistic philosophy and theology.

Satolli came to the United States in 1889, was present at the centenary of the hierarchy celebrated in Baltimore and delivered an address at the inauguration of the Catholic University of America in November. On his second visit, he attended on 16 November 1892 a meeting of the archbishops held in New York City and formulated in fourteen propositions the solution of certain school problems which had been for some time under discussion. He then took up his residence at the Catholic University of America, where he gave a course of lectures on the philosophy of St. Thomas.

On 24 January 1893, the Apostolic Delegation in the United States was established at Washington, D.C. and Satolli was appointed first delegate. He was created cardinal-priest on 29 November 1895, with the titular church of Santa Maria in Ara Coeli.

His three-quarter length seated portrait was painted in 1893 by the Swiss-born American artist Adolfo Müller-Ury (1862–1947).

Returning to Rome in October 1896, he was appointed prefect of the Congregation of Studies and archpriest of the Lateran Basilica. He became Cardinal Bishop of Frascati on 22 June 1903. His last visit to the United States was on the occasion of the St. Louis Exposition, 1904. He died on 8 January 1910, at Rome.

Writings 
Satolli's works include:
"Enchiridion Philosophiae" (Rome, 1884)
 Commentaries on the Summa Theologica of St. Thomas (5 volumes, Rome, 1884–88)
 "Prima principia juris publici ecclesiastici de concordatis" (Rome, 1888)
 "Loyalty to Church and State" (Baltimore, 1895).

References

External links 
  

1839 births
1910 deaths
People from Marsciano
20th-century Italian cardinals
Cardinals created by Pope Leo XIII
Cardinal-bishops of Frascati
Apostolic Nuncios to the United States
Presidents of the Pontifical Ecclesiastical Academy
19th-century Italian cardinals